The South African Railways Class 16B 4-6-2 of 1917 was a steam locomotive.

In November 1917, the South African Railways placed ten Class 16B steam locomotives with a 4-6-2 Pacific type wheel arrangement in passenger train service.

Manufacturer
The Class 16B 4-6-2 Pacific type locomotive was designed by D.A. Hendrie, Chief Mechanical Engineer (CME) of the South African Railways (SAR), and built in 1917 by the North British Locomotive Company (NBL) in Glasgow, Scotland. Ten locomotives were delivered and placed in service in November 1917, numbered in the range from 802 to 811.

Characteristics

They were identical to the predecessor Class 16 and successor Class 16C in most respects, except that they had wider cabs than the Class 16, while the Class 16C was equipped with a combustion chamber in the firebox. Other minor alterations from the Class 16's characteristics were the injector and some cab and footplate arrangements.

Watson Standard boilers
During the 1930s, many serving locomotives were reboilered with a standard boiler type designed by A.G. Watson, CME of the SAR at the time, as part of his standardisation policy. Such Watson Standard reboilered locomotives were reclassified by adding an "R" suffix to their classification.

Eventually all ten Class 16B locomotives as well as all thirty Class 16C locomotives were reboilered with Watson Standard no 2B boilers. In the process of reboilering, the main difference between the Class 16B and Class 16C, Hendrie's combustion chamber behind the Class 16C boiler, disappeared and the reboilered Class 16B locomotives were also reclassified to Class 16CR. Early conversions were equipped with copper and later conversions with steel fireboxes. In the process, they were also equipped with Watson cabs with their distinctive slanted fronts, compared to the conventional vertical fronts of their original cabs.

Some ex Class 16B locomotives erroneously received new number plates after reboilering which identified them as Class 16BR, even though such an SAR Class never officially existed.

Their original Belpaire boilers were fitted with Ramsbottom safety valves, while the Watson Standard boiler was fitted with Pop safety valves. An obvious visual difference between an original and a Watson Standard reboilered locomotive is usually a rectangular regulator cover, just to the rear of the chimney on the reboilered locomotive. In the case of the Class 16B and Class 16CR, two even more obvious differences are the Watson cab and the absence of the Belpaire firebox hump between the cab and boiler on the reboilered locomotives.

Service

The Class 16B Pacifics were placed in express passenger service, working fast passenger services between Pretoria and Johannesburg and hauling all the important passenger trains of the time, such as the Natal mail train on the section between Johannesburg and Volksrust and the Cape mail train on the section between Johannesburg and Klerksdorp. When they were replaced by newer locomotives like the Class 16D, they were relegated to less glamorous passenger duties until, by the 1940s, they were in suburban and transfer service.

During the 1950s, some were relocated to Durban to assist the Class 14R on the South Coast line. When this line was electrified in 1967, they were again relocated, this time to Port Elizabeth, where they worked suburban trains to Uitenhage. Others remained on the Witwatersrand, working the suburban to Springs and Nigel, double-heading with Class 15ARs on Pietersburg-bound trains out of Pretoria, as well as shunting and local pickup service. They were withdrawn from service between 1975 and 1976.

Two of these locomotives have some claim to fame. In its original form as a class 16B, no. 809 was painted in royal blue livery, with the main frames painted in a lilac colour to off-set the blue boiler and cab. It worked the 1934 Royal Train from Johannesburg to Klerksdorp during the visit to South Africa of His Royal Highness Prince George, Duke of Kent.

Long-time South African Minister of Transport Ben Schoeman started his Railway career at Braam­fontein during the 1930s as a stoker on no. 805. When no. 805 was withdrawn from service, by then reboilered and reclassified to Class 16CR, this locomotive was actually de-reboilered to its original Class 16B condition. A dummy boiler which looked like the original boiler with its Belpaire firebox was fabricated and installed and it was refitted with an original wide Hendrie cab which was found dumped at the old Pretoria Mechanical Workshops.

It was then plinthed outside the new Johannesburg station on 18 and 19 March 1974, with the work taking two days to complete. The Minister of Transport, the Hon. B.J. Schoeman, unveiled the commemorative plaque during a ceremony on 1 July 1974.

In the early 1990s, the locomotive was removed from Johannesburg station to be exhibited in the Outeniqua Transport Museum at George.

Preservation

Illustration

References

1900
1900
1900
4-6-2 locomotives
2′C1′ h2 locomotives
NBL locomotives
Cape gauge railway locomotives
Railway locomotives introduced in 1917
1917 in South Africa